Jeannace June Freeman (1941/42 - 2003) was the first woman ever sentenced to death in the U.S. state of Oregon, and remained the only woman sentenced to death in Oregon until 2011. Her conviction was upheld by the Oregon Supreme Court, though she was not in fact executed.

She was sentenced to death in 1961, for the murder of her partner Gertrude May Nuñez Jackson's two children. They met when Jackson (32 years old) hired Freeman (19) as a babysitter. They soon became lovers, though the relationship was volatile.

According to Jackson's later testimony in court, Freeman beat Jackson's son Larry to death in a fit of rage. Jackson agreed to conceal the crime and go along with killing her daughter Martha. They discarded both children's bodies in Crooked River Gorge, at Peter Skene Ogden State Scenic Viewpoint.

The pair fled to California, where they were arrested a few weeks after the children's bodies were discovered and identified. Jackson was sentenced to life in prison, while Freeman was sentenced to death. When Oregon voters abolished capital punishment in 1964, Gov. Mark Hatfield commuted Freeman's sentence to life imprisonment. She served 20 years, while Jackson served seven. Freeman changed her name to Wilma Lin Rhule, and was later sent back to prison for assault. Freeman died in 2003.

References

1940 births
2003 deaths
American female murderers
American people convicted of murder
American murderers of children
Prisoners sentenced to death by Oregon
Women sentenced to death
Year of birth uncertain

People convicted of murder by Oregon